Józef Korbicz (born 1951) – Ph.D., D.Sc., is an engineer and a full-rank professor at the University of Zielona Góra. Ordinary member of the Polish Academy of Sciences.

Scientific activity areas 
 process diagnostics: fault detection and isolation, analytical methods, intelligent computations, robust observers
 artificial intelligence methods and techniques: artificial neural networks, neuro-fuzzy systems, expert systems, evolutionary computations
 modelling and simulation of processes with spatio-temporal dynamics: measurement sensors placement, Kalman filters, parameter identification
 applications: air protection, power engineering and sugar industry

Employment history 
University of Zielona Góra (formerly the Technical University of Zielona Góra/Higher College of Engineering):
 head of the Discipline Council of Information and Communication Technology: since 2019
 director of the Institute of Control and Computation Engineering: since 1992 (founder)
 deputy rector for scientific research and international cooperation: 1999–2008
 dean of the Faculty of Electrical Engineering: 1996–1999

Degrees and titles 
 M.Sc.: 1975, Kiev University of Technology, Ukraine
 Ph.D.: 1980, Kiev University of Technology, Ukraine
 D.Sc.: 1986, Kiev University of Technology, Ukraine
 Professor: 1993, Institute of Systems Research of the Polish Academy of Sciences, Warsaw

Major recent publications 
 Kulczycki P., Korbicz J., Kacprzyk J. (Eds.): Automatyka, robotyka i przetwarzanie informacji – Warszawa: Wydawnictwo Naukowe PWN, 2020, 768 p. (in Polish)
 Korbicz J., Maniewski R., Patan K., Kowal M. (Eds.): Current Trends in Biomedical Engineering and Bioimages Analysis – Berlin: Springer, 2020, 338 p.
 Korbicz J., Kowal M. (Eds.): Intelligent Systems in Technical and Medical Diagnostics – Berlin: Springer, 2014, 536 p.
 Tadeusiewicz R., Korbicz J., Rutkowski L., Duch W. (Red.): Sieci neuronowe w inżynierii biomedycznej – Inżynieria biomedyczna. Podstawy i zastosowania, tom 9, Warszawa: Akademicka Oficyna Wydawnicza EXIT, 2013, 745 p. (in Polish)
 Korbicz J., Kościelny J.M. (Eds.): Modeling, Diagnostics and Process Control: Implementation in the DiaSter System – Berlin: Springer, 2010, 384 p.
 Korbicz J., Kościelny J.M. (Eds.):  – Warsaw: Wydawnictwa Naukowo-Techniczne, 2009, 446 p. (in Polish)
 Korbicz J., Kościelny J.M., Kowalczuk Z., Cholewa W. (Eds.): Fault Diagnosis: Models, Artificial Intelligence, Applications – Berlin: Springer, 2004, 920 p.
 Korbicz J., Kościelny J.M., Kowalczuk Z., Cholewa W. (Red.): Diagnostyka procesów. Modele, metody sztucznej inteligencji, zastosowania – Warsaw: Wydawnictwa Naukowo-Techniczne, 2004, 828 p. (in Polish)

Research visits abroad 
Visiting professor
 Russia: Far Eastern Federal University, Vladivistok, 2015
 France: Nancy University, 2009
 China: University of Hong Kong, 2006
 Australia: Swinburne University, Melbourne, 2006
 USA: University of Alaska, Fairbanks, 2002; University of Colorado, Boulder, 1994 and 1996
 Canada: University of Alberta, Edmonton, 2002; University of Quebec, Hull, 1992
Internships and scholarships
 Germany: University of Duisburg; University of Wuppertal – DAAD scholarship, 1994
 USA: Virginia University, Charlottesville; University of Colorado, Boulder – IREX scholarship, 1991
 Ukraine: Kiev University of Technology; Institute of Cybernetics of the Ukrainian Academy of Sciences – postdoctoral internship, 1983–1986

Memberships 
International
 Institute of Electrical and Electronics Engineers (IEEE): Systems, Man and Cybernetics Society; Control Systems Society, since 1992; Senior Member since 2002
 International Federation of Automatic Control (IFAC): Technical Committee on Detection, Supervision and Safety for Technical Processes, SAFEPROCESS, since 1997
National
 Polish Academy of Sciences (PAN): corresponding member, since 2007; ordinary member, since 2020
 Committee on Automatic Control and Robotics of the Polish Academy of Sciences, since 1993
 Polish Academy of Sciences Team for Cooperation with the International Institute for Applied Systems Analysis (IIASA), Laxenburg, Austria, 2003–2010
 management of the Interuniversity Computerisation Centre,  2008–2012

Posts related to scientific activity 
 founder and editor-in-chief of the International Journal of Applied Mathematics and Computer Science, since 1991
 chairman of the Committee on Automatic Control and Robotics of the Polish Academy of Sciences, since 2015; head of the committee's Section on Intelligent Systems, 1996-2015
 chairman of the Scientific Council of the Systems Research Institute of the Polish Academy of Sciences: since 2015
 chairman of the Commission on Engineering Cybernetics of the Poznań Branch of the Polish Academy of Sciences, 2003-2015
 chairman of the Commission on Automatic Control and Computer Science of the Poznań Branch of the Polish Academy of Sciences (2015-2019)
 chairman of the Commission on Computer Science and Automatic Control of the Poznań Branch of the Polish Academy of Sciences, since 2020
 president of the Lubuskie Scientific Society, since 1993

Awards and distinctions 
 Rzeszów University of Technology Medal of Merit, 2018
Medal 50 Years of the Faculty of Computer, Electrical and Control Engineering of the University of Zielona Góra, 2017
Silver medal of 100 Years of Renewal of Traditions of the Warsaw University of Technology (Faculty of Mechatronics), 2016
Diploma of an Honorary Ambassador of Polish Congresses – Polish Tourism Organisation and Polish Conference and Congress Association, 2016
Order of Polonia Restituta, 2012
 Medal of the National Education Commission, 2000
 Gold Cross of Merit, 1999
 scientific team award of the Minister of National Education and Sports, 2003
 individual scientific awards of the Minister of National Education and Sports, 1987 and 1989
 individual and team awards of the Rector of the University of Zielona Góra (previously the Technical University of Zielona Góra), annually since 1987
 Prof. Paweł Jan Nowicki Medal, Association of Polish Electrical Engineers, 2013
 Certificate-Diploma of the Polish Neural Networks Society in recognition of outstanding contribution to the development of computational intelligence, 2014

External links 
 

1951 births
Living people
Polish engineers